Bygstad is a village in Sunnfjord Municipality in Vestland county, Norway.

The village is an old church site where there once was a stave church here dating back to the 13th century.  The present Bygstad Church was built in 1845 and it serves the western part of the municipality of Gaular.

Notable residents
Jenny Ellaug Følling, a Norwegian politician
Kristian Lien, a Norwegian politician

References

Villages in Vestland
Sunnfjord